{{DISPLAYTITLE:C15H12O7}}
The molecular formula C15H12O7 (molar mass: 304.25 g/mol, exact mass: 304.058303 u) may refer to:

 Dihydromorin, a flavanonol

 Taxifolin (epitaxifolin), a flavanonol
 Hydrorobinetin, a flavonoid

Molecular formulas